Kotido Airport  is a small civilian airport that serves the town of Kotido in Uganda.

See also
 
 
 Civil Aviation Authority of Uganda
 Transport in Uganda
 List of airports in Uganda

References

External links
Uganda Civil Aviation Authority Homepage
OurAirports - Kotido
FallingRain - Kotido Airport

Airports in Uganda
Kotido District